The filetail catshark (Parmaturus xaniurus) is an Eastern Pacific endemic deepwater catshark ranging from Oregon to the Gulf of California. Adults are epibenthic and found near areas of rocky vertical relief over soft mud bottoms on the outer continental shelf and upper slope at depths of 91 to 1,251 m, juveniles are mesopelagic, found around 500 m off the bottom in waters over 1,000 m deep. They have been seen at the Lasuen Knoll during ROV expeditions at roughly 300 m deep. Reaches a maximum size of 60 cm TL. An oviparous species, females deposit eggcases throughout the year with concentrated reproductive output July through September. There is no information available on the age and growth, longevity, fecundity, abundance or mortality of this species. It is not targeted by commercial fisheries or utilized for human consumption, but is known to be incidental catch in longline and bottom trawl fisheries, although no specific data is available.

References

External links

 
 Compagno, Dando, & Fowler, Sharks, Collins Gem, HarperCollins, London 2006 
 https://web.archive.org/web/20120419001917/http://www.montereybayaquarium.org/animals/animaldetails.aspx?enc=Z5SIVkZ+n+XygKnuMkYzNQ

Parmaturus
Western North American coastal fauna
Fish of the Gulf of California
Fish described in 1892